Team Roberts KR211V was a racing motorcycle developed by Kenny Roberts' MotoGP team, Team Roberts, and uses the 990cc V5 engine from the Honda RC211V bike. It was created to compete in the 2006 MotoGP series and was piloted by Kenny Roberts, Jr., eldest son of Kenny Roberts.

KR211V results

(key) (results in bold indicate pole position; results in italics indicate fastest lap)

External links 
 Team Roberts official web site

Grand Prix motorcycles